Sergio Fernando Peña Flores (born 28 September 1995) is a Peruvian professional footballer who plays for Allsvenskan club Malmö FF and the Peru national team as a midfielder.

Club career
Born in Lima, Peña finished his formation with hometown's Alianza Lima, after joining the club's youth setup in 2003, aged eight. On 18 February 2012, aged only 16, he made his first team debut, starting in a 2–2 home draw against León de Huánuco for the Torneo Descentralizado championship. It was his maiden appearance of the season, under manager Pepe Soto.

Peña was made a starter by new manager Wilmar Valencia for the 2013 campaign. On 16 March 2013, he played his first Peruvian Clásico, replacing Henry Quinteros in the 69th minute and providing the assist for Yordy Reyna's winning goal in the 84th minute.

On 23 May 2013, Peña was sold to an investment group linked to Udinese Calcio and Granada CF. He was assigned to the latter's reserves in Segunda División B.

Peña subsequently had loans to his former club Alianza Lima and Universidad de San Martín de Porres, before returning to Granada and its reserve team in January 2017. On 1 September of that year, he extended his contract until 2020 and was definitely promoted to the main squad.

On 13 July 2018, Peña was loaned to Primeira Liga side C.D. Tondela on a one-year deal.

On 3 August 2019, he signed for Eredivisie side FC Emmen on a three-year contract.

On 4 August 2021, he penned a deal with Allsvenskan side Malmö FF through 2024.

International career
Peña was named in the Peru national team's senior squad for the 2018 World Cup qualifiers against Argentina and Chile in September 2016, as well as the qualifiers against Venezuela and Uruguay in March 2017. In May 2018, he was named in Peru’s provisional 24 man squad for the 2018 World Cup in Russia. However, a few days later he was taken off the provisional 24-man squad to make room for Paolo Guerrero. With Pena saying “It was the hardest day of my career.”

Career statistics

International
As of match played 11 November 2021. Scores and results list Peru's goal tally first.
International goals

Honours

Malmö FF
 Allsvenskan: 2021
 Svenska Cupen: 2021–22

References

External links

1995 births
Living people
Footballers from Lima
Peruvian footballers
Association football midfielders
Peruvian Primera División players
Club Alianza Lima footballers
Club Deportivo Universidad de San Martín de Porres players
Segunda División players
Segunda División B players
Eredivisie players
Club Recreativo Granada players
Granada CF footballers
Primeira Liga players
C.D. Tondela players
FC Emmen players
Allsvenskan players
Malmö FF players
2015 South American Youth Football Championship players
2021 Copa América players
Peru international footballers
Peru under-20 international footballers
Peruvian expatriate footballers
Peruvian expatriate sportspeople in Spain
Peruvian expatriate sportspeople in Portugal
Peruvian expatriate sportspeople in the Netherlands
Expatriate footballers in Spain
Expatriate footballers in Portugal
Expatriate footballers in the Netherlands
Expatriate footballers in Sweden